Alexander Nevsky Cemetery is a cemetery in Juhkentali subdistrict, Tallinn, Estonia; an apostolic part of Siselinna Cemetery. The cemetery is named after the nearby Alexander Nevsky Cathedral.

The cemetery was established in 1775.

All important local orthodox leaders are buried to this cemetery. In addition, lower clergymen, military men, civil officials etc are buried to this cemetery.

Burials
 Erast Hiatsintov
 Aleksander Pallas
 Jaan Poska
 Igor Severyanin
 Arvi Siig
 Sergei Soldatov
 Roman Steinberg

References

External links
 

Cemeteries in Tallinn
Eastern Orthodox cemeteries
1775 establishments in the Russian Empire